Colobothea mosaica is a species of beetle in the family Cerambycidae. It was described by Henry Walter Bates in 1865. It is known from Venezuela.

References

mosaica
Beetles described in 1865